The New York City Schools Chancellor (formally "Chancellor of the New York City Department of Education") is the head of the New York City Department of Education. The Chancellor is appointed by the Mayor, and serves at the Mayor's pleasure. The Chancellor is responsible for the day-to-day operation of the department as well as responsible of all New York City Public Schools. The Chancellor is also a member of the New York City Panel for Educational Policy (formerly the New York City Board of Education). The current Chancellor is David C. Banks.

History of position

Under NYC Board of Education
While searching for a permanent Superintendent of Schools in 1970 for Nathan Brown, the Board of Education named Irving Anker to serve as Acting Superintendent until the position was filled. The Board had approached, and been turned down by, such notables as Ralph Bunche, Ramsey Clark, Arthur J. Goldberg and Sargent Shriver, before choosing Harvey B. Scribner, who had been Commissioner of the Vermont Department of Education and superintendent of the Teaneck Public Schools, where he oversaw the implementation of a voluntary school integration program.

Citing what he called a "confidence gap" with the Board of Education, Scribner announced in December 1972 that he would leave his post as Chancellor when his three-year contract ended on June 30, 1973. Before going on a terminal vacation starting on April 1, 1973, Chancellor Scribner named Anker, then Deputy Chancellor, to serve as Acting Chancellor.  Anker was then named permanent Chancellor in June 1973.

After taking office in January 1978 as Mayor of New York, Ed Koch forced out Anker as Chancellor in favor of Frank Macchiarola, a key Koch advisor who had been a vice president of the CUNY Graduate Center and deputy director of the New York State Emergency Financial Control Board for New York City; Anker would serve until his contract ended on June 30, 1978.

Alvarado was named as Chancellor in April 1983, the city's first Hispanic Chancellor. Alvarado resigned as School Chancellor in May 1984 in the wake of professional misconduct charges, including allegations that he had borrowed $80,000 from employees in coercive fashion. Nathan Quinones was selected as Chancellor, having served in the position on an interim basis after Alvarado placed himself on leave two months earlier.

Quinones was pressured to resign in 1987, in the face of criticism for his management of the district and its finances, with mayoral candidate Carol Bellamy saying that he "consistently failed to provide the leadership or sound management we need".

Harold O. Levy was the last Chancellor to be selected directly by the Board of Education, serving during the final years of Mayor Rudy Giuliani and the early part of the Bloomberg administration.

Under mayoral control
Joel Klein was named as Chancellor in July 2002 by Mayor Michael Bloomberg, the first to be named in the reorganized system in which the Mayor of New York was given direct control of the Board of Education.

In November 2010, Cathie Black was named as the first female chancellor by Mayor Michael Bloomberg. Because of her lack of educational experience and administrative licensing, Black required a waiver from the Commissioner of Education of the State of New York, who at that time was David M. Steiner, in order to take office. The waiver was issued, and Black took office on January 3, 2011.

List of New York City Schools chancellors

Individuals who have led the New York City school system include:

 David C. Banks 2022–present
 Meisha Ross Porter 2021
 Richard Carranza 2018–2021
 Carmen Fariña 2014–2018
 Dennis Walcott 2011–2013
 Cathie Black 2011
 Joel Klein 2002–2010
 Harold O. Levy 2000–2002
 Dr. Rudy Crew 1995–1999
 Ramon C. Cortines 1993–1995
 Dr. Harvey Garner (interim) July – August 1993
 Dr. Joseph A. Fernandez 1990–1993
 Bernard Mecklowitz (interim) June – December 1989
 Dr. Richard Green 1988–1989
 Dr. Charles I. Schonhaut (acting) 1988
 Nathan Quinones 1984–1987
 Anthony J. Alvarado 1983–1984
 Richard F. Halverson (acting) 1983
 Frank Macchiarola 1978–1983
 Harvey B. Scribner 1970–1973
 Irving Anker 1970, 1973–1978
 Nathan Brown 1969–1970
 Calvin E. Gross 1963–1965
 Bernard E. Donovan 1962–1963, 1965–1969
 John J. Theobald 1958–1962
 William Jansen 1947–1958
 John E. Wade 1942–1947
 Harold G. Campbell 1934–1942
 William J. O’Shea 1924–1934
 William L. Ettinger 1918–1924
 William H. Maxwell 1898–1918

References

Further reading
The Encyclopedia of New York City. New York: Yale University Press, 1995.

New York City Department of Education